In neuroanatomy, the centrum semiovale, semioval center or centrum ovale is the central area of white matter found underneath the cerebral cortex.
The white matter, located in each hemisphere between the cerebral cortex and nuclei, as a whole has a semioval shape. It consists of cortical projection fibers, association fibers and cortical fibers. It continues ventrally as the corona radiata.

References

External links
 http://www.anatomyatlases.org/MicroscopicAnatomy/Section17/Plate17351.shtml
 http://www.med.harvard.edu/AANLIB/cases/caseB/054t_2.gif
 https://web.archive.org/web/20071114074658/http://www.dartmouth.edu/~btharris/Case_of_Quarter/Case_4/case_4_home.htm (see figure 4)

Cerebral white matter